Fenn Farm is a historic property on Case Street in Middlebury, Vermont.  Developed c. 1828 as a sheep farm but now diversified, it now includes a well-preserved collection of mid-19th century farm buildings.  It was listed on the National Register of Historic Places in 1995.

Description and history
The landscape consists of rolling hills, divided into a combination of uses, including pasture, agriculture, and woodland. The farm buildings are set in a cluster on the west side of the road. The oldest portion of the farmhouse is a -story Cape style three-bay wood-frame structure, built by 1840 (and possibly as early as 1828), with a series of additions to the rear. Farm buildings from the 19th century include a c. 1860 horse barn and granary, and a c. 1880 piggery. Twentieth-century buildings include a hen house, milk house, and circular silo.

Land for the farm was first cleared about 1828 by Silas Torrance, who engaged in the raising of sheep.  By 1850, the property was owned by Daniel Sessions, and the farm was more diversified, producing grain and dairy products in addition to wool.  In 1854 the property was acquired by James Fenn, and it has remained in the hands of his descendants since then.  Emphasis on dairy production increased significantly in the early 20th century, and chicken and egg production was furthered by the construction of the hen house in the 1980s.

See also
National Register of Historic Places listings in Addison County, Vermont

References

Historic districts on the National Register of Historic Places in Vermont
National Register of Historic Places in Addison County, Vermont
Farms on the National Register of Historic Places in Vermont
Buildings and structures completed in 1828
Buildings and structures in Middlebury, Vermont